Kristian Hoem Sørli (born 8 August 1976) is a retired Norwegian footballer who last played for Strindheim in the 2. divisjon. He has also played for Rosenborg BK, IK Start, Viking FK, Strømsgodset IF and Ranheim.

In 2016, he became the head coach of IL Brodd.

Career statistics

References

1976 births
Living people
Norwegian footballers
Strindheim IL players
Rosenborg BK players
IK Start players
Viking FK players
Strømsgodset Toppfotball players
Stavanger IF players
Ranheim Fotball players
Norwegian First Division players
Eliteserien players
Association football defenders
Footballers from Trondheim